Belbroughton is a village and civil parish in the Bromsgrove District of Worcestershire, England.  According to the 2001 census it had a population of 2,380. It is about six miles north of Bromsgrove, six miles east of Kidderminster and four miles south of Stourbridge. The village of Clent is nearby.  The village is served by bus service 318 (Bromsgrove-Stourbridge) operared by Kev's Cars and Coaches.

History

Belbroughton was at the core of the North Worcestershire scythe-making district. Many of the mills of the area were formerly blade mills used for sharpening them, after a scythesmith had forged them from iron, with a thin strip of steel along the cutting edge.  From the late 18th century until about 1870, the Waldron family of Field House Clent were the leading manufacturers.  They were succeeded by Isaac Nash, whose business finally closed in 1967.  Scythes were formerly not just made in Belbroughton, but also several adjacent parishes, including Chaddesley Corbett.

In Belbroughton in 1831, with a population of 1,476, 68 weekly payments for poor relief were made. Poor relief however was only due to residents of a parish, provable through a certificate of residence.

At the crossroads in the nearby hamlet of Bell Heath, there is a boulder that was brought by glacial process from Arenig Fawr, a mountain within Snowdonia, in Gwynedd. A plaque reads "Boulder from Arenig Mountain in N. Wales, Brought here by the Welsh Ice-Sheet in the Glacial Period".

Facilities
Facilities include a village shop, which includes the post office, a hairdressers and a recreational centre with tennis courts, children's playground and playing field. There is an active cricket club on the outskirts of the village. The area also has a number of public houses in Belbroughton itself and in neighbouring villages.

Education
Belbroughton Primary School is located in the village, after which students progress to Haybridge High School, in the nearby village of Hagley.

Politics
Belbroughton is in the constituency of Bromsgrove a traditionally Conservative area with the current MP being Sajid Javid, a member of the Conservative Party (UK).

Local events
Since 1996 Belbroughton has hosted Scarecrow Weekend the last weekend of each September. Founded by Steve Haywood (The Crowman) Children's Author and Artist. Villagers create scarecrows and display them outside their homes.  It has proved very popular over recent years with thousands of visitors, raising tens of thousands of pounds for local organisations and amenities.

Flooding
On 7 September 2008 heavy rain caused Belne Brook, which runs through the village, to swell. The rising water was held back by a seven-foot wall but the pressure of the water caused it to break. The surge of water tore through the village sweeping away cars and causing severe water damage (and in some cases structural damage) to many properties. The current was so strong, it made tarmac ripple.

Photogallery

References

Sources

External links

Belbroughton Net (This site utilises Flash 8 Player)
 Belbroughton scarecrows come out to play BBC 25 September 2003

Villages in Worcestershire